Kamran Inan (1929 – 23 November 2015), Turkish politician, statesman of Kurdish origin, diplomat and scholar. He was born in Hizan, Bitlis Province. Representative in Parliament from Van and Bitlis numerous times.  Graduate of Ankara University Faculty of Law, and Ph.D. in Law from University of Geneva.  At various times Turkish UN Ambassador, permanent UN representative, Turkish Minister of Energy and Natural Resources and Minister of State, Senator from Bitlis and member of Foreign Affairs Commission. He published numerous books on Turkish politics and history.

In 2006, he returned the Légion d'honneur medal he had received from France due to the French government involvement with Armenian ethnic activities.  He has also received European Parliament Gold Medal and Turkey–EEC Partnership Silver Medal.

References

1929 births
2015 deaths
People from Hizan
Turkish Kurdish politicians
Nationalist Democracy Party politicians
Motherland Party (Turkey) politicians
Government ministers of Turkey
Deputies of Bitlis
Deputies of Van
Members of the Senate of the Republic (Turkey)
Permanent Representatives of Turkey to the United Nations
Ankara University alumni
Ministers of Energy and Natural Resources of Turkey
Members of the 21st Parliament of Turkey
Members of the 20th Parliament of Turkey
Members of the 41st government of Turkey
Members of the 48th government of Turkey
Ministers of State of Turkey